Montois may refer to:

 Le Montois, geographic area approximated by the former communauté de communes du Montois, Seine-et-Marne, France
 Adjective, demonym, and dialect of:
 Mons, Belgium, city
 Mont-de-Marsan, commune in Landes, France
 Stade Montois rugby club
 Stade Montois (football)
 Mont Saint-Michel, island commune in Manche, France
 Montois-la-Montagne, commune in Moselle, France
 , Belgian architect

See also
 Ville-au-Montois, commune in Meurthe-et-Moselle, France
 Maurupt-le-Montois, commune in Marne, France